Pija Lindenbaum (born Pia Margareta Lindenbaum 27 April 1955 in Sundsvall, Sweden) is a Swedish illustrator, author and designer. 1999–2007 she owned the 14th chair of the Swedish Academy for Children's Books. She has illustrated the Tsatsiki books written by Moni Nilsson-Brännström.

Bibliography
1980 – Krisen i den kommunistiska rörelsen (cover art, written by Fernando Claudin)
1986 – Boeing 747 (illustrator, written by Ulf Nilsson)
1990 – Else-Marie and her seven little daddies (adapted by Gabrielle Charbonnet) (Else-Marie och småpapporna)
1991 – Boodil my dog (retold by Gabrielle Charbonnet) (Boken om Bodil)
1992 – Louie (Bra Börje) (together with Barbro Lindgren)
1994 – Min!
1994 – Ä dä?
1995 – Nam-Nam
1995 – Ha den
1996 – Britten och prins Benny
1997 – Starke Arvid
1998 – Glossas café
2000 – Bridget and the gray wolves Gittan och gråvargarna
2001 – Bridget and the muttonheads (Gittan och fårskallarna)
2002 – Mirabelle (Mirabell) (illustrator, written by Astrid Lindgren)
2003 – Bridget and the moose brothers (Gittan och älgbrorsorna)
2004 – Säger hunden?
2005 – When Owen's mom breathed fire (När Åkes mamma glömde bort)
2006 – Mini Mia and her darling uncle (Lill-Zlatan och morbror raring)
2007 – Kenta och barbisarna
2009 – Siv sover vilse

Awards
1990 & 2006 – BMF Plaque (for the books Else-Marie och småpapporna and Lill-Zlatan och morbror raring)
1990 – Expressens Heffaklump (for the book Else-Marie och småpapporna)
1993 – Elsa Beskow Plaque (for the book Bra Börje)
2000 – August Prize (for the book Gittan och gråvargarna)
2000 – Bokjuryn
2000 – Rabén & Sjögrens tecknarstipendium
2005 – Wettergrens barnbokollon
2005 – Bokhandelns val
2005 – Stockholms stads hederspris
2008 – Astrid Lindgren Award
2012 – Deutscher Jugendliteraturpreis (for the book Siv sover vilse)

References

External links

Swedish-language writers
1955 births
Living people
Swedish children's writers
Swedish women children's writers
Swedish illustrators
August Prize winners
Swedish women illustrators
Swedish children's book illustrators